Kalki Bhagawan (born 7 March 1949 as Vijay Kumar Naidu), also known as Sri Bhagavan, is a self-styled Indian  godman, cult leader, businessman, and a real estate investor. A former clerk in the LIC, he claims to be an incarnation of God (the Kalki Avatar). He is the founder of 'Oneness' / 'Ekam' cult and White Lotus Conglomerate.

Vijay kumar encourages his followers to worship him as God; and claims to be a divine Avatar capable of performing miracles. He has also claimed to be a Messiah destined to give spiritual enlightenment to mankind. In 1989, he launched a New Religious Movement called Oneness, and prophesied to inaugurate a spiritual golden age in the world in the year 2012. When no such event occurred on 21st December 2012, disappointed followers left the cult and it was handed over to his son NKV Krishna (“Krishnaji”) and daughter-in-law Preetha Krishna (“Preethaji”). They have rebranded it under different names like 'Ekam', 'pkconsciousness', and 'O&O Academy'.

Alongside Ekam, Kalki and his family also own the White Lotus Conglomerate. It is a multimillion dollar group of companies with interests in real estate, mining, entertainment, sport, agriculture, education, finance and manufacturing. Many of these are shell companies and exist only as mailing addresses. Prominent Acharyas in the former Oneness cult like Anandagiri and Samadarshini sit on the boards of these companies.

In 2002, social activist Viswanath Swami filed a complaint with the Indian Income-Tax Department, alleging that Kalki Bhagavan had floated multiple trusts for rural development and obtained tax exemption for funds collected by these trusts. Swami also alleged that Kalki Bhagavan was using these funds to help setup multiple corporations for his son NKV Krishna, rather than using the money for the stated purpose.

In 2019, Indian law enforcement agencies raided Kalki Bhagavan's properties and confiscated unaccounted assets worth US$67 Million. The Enforcement Directorate attached 900 acres of land belonging to his ashram and registered a case against him under the Foreign Exchange Management Act.

In November 2019, he suffered a heart attack.

Oneness "Ekam" Cult

Background 
Kalki Bhagavan and his wife, Amma, portrayed themselves as divine beings; through this portrayal, the general population of India viewed them as righteous and omniscient gods. As a result of these perceived characteristics, believers paid enormous sums of money to meet Kalki and Amma Bhagavan. In addition, in return for a substantial investment, those believers would receive invaluable documents, gold chains and other articles that in actuality was nowhere near the worth of the actual investments.

Allegations of Fraud and founding of White Lotus Conglomerate 
As the spiritual movement grew exceedingly popular, Kalki Bhagavan and Amma Bhagavan established corporations or organizations (under the umbrella of White Lotus Conglomerate) that would funnel charitable donations from the group’s fervent followers. Followers who invested their money believed that it was strengthening the movement and would ultimately bring enlightenment to the masses. Unfortunately, these funds were used to purchase individual assets and were transferred to form various private companies and business entities. 

According to various reports, both Amma Bhagavan and Kalki Bhagavan, profited tremendously through their manifested beliefs and spiritual network. Various individuals, who were close to the Bhagavans, claimed that the individuals established business entities and private limited companies through the large sums of monies they received from cash donations made to the spiritual cause.

The monies received were meant to conduct rural work in various regions throughout India; however, investigations and various allegations claimed that the Bhagavan’s were siphoning off the funding streams to purchase personal assets. The siphoning of money from these various trusts—which were intended to further the movement— was a manipulative and egregious attempt to take monies from individuals who believed they were making charitable contributions towards the advancement of a spiritual and righteous cause.

Rebranding the cult - 'Ekam' 
Over the years, Kalki Bhagavan's Oneness movement has called itself various names including the Foundation for World Awakening, Golden Age Foundation, Bhagavad Dharma, Kalki Dharma, Oneness University and Living in Joy Foundation.

In 2017, the Oneness organization was handed over to Kalki Bhagavan's son, NKV Krishna and daughter-in-law Preetha Krishna. They have renamed the cult to 'Ekam'. During 2019, NKV Krishna and Preetha Krishna published a book together, called The Four Sacred Secrets, writing under the names 'Krishnaji' and 'Preethaji'. In January 2020, NKV Krishna was interviewed by Nick Duerden of the British edition of GQ magazine. In the interview, NKV Krishna claimed to be a guru with 10 million followers in India. Krishna told the interviewer that his father saw otherworldly visions, including “...a gigantic golden orb of light provoking him to chant and meditate for the liberation of humankind”, and that he has inherited those visions.

Devotees abandoning the movement

Shankara Bhagawat (R. Sankar), Vijaykumar's first serious disciple and close childhood friend, who co-founded the Oneness Organization, left him in 1998, after alleging that Oneness Movement was controlling and manipulative. Freddy Nielsen, Vijaykumar's close associate from Sweden and his long-time follower since 1989, left him in 2005 after directing severe criticism against Kalki Bhagavan and the Oneness Movement.

In November 2009 there was a significant change, when 25 of the senior instructors, including NKV Krishna, Anandagiri and Vimalkirti, disaffiliated from Kalki and Amma Bhagavan to form their own organization, which they named 'One World Academy'.

Arjuna Ardagh, author of the book Awakening into Oneness noted in 2010 that more than 70 percent of the people he interviewed  for the book had ceased their association with Oneness Organization and Kalki Bhagavan due to disappointment, disillusionment, allegations and controversies. He outlined this an afterword he added to his book Awakening into Oneness (Dutch edition). In particular, he mentioned Erwin Laslow, who wrote the book's foreword, Rani Kumra, who ran the American movement, and scientist Christian Opitz who researched the effects of deeksha in the brain. In addition, Ardagh wrote that the '100 Village Project' he referred to in Chapter 10 of Awakening into Oneness had been abandoned.

Since 2013, many Westerners lost interest in the Oneness Movement when they did not experience any 'spiritual awakening'. There was further disappointment when, after 2012, the much anticipated and supposed 'Golden Age' was not perceivable in people's lives.

Accusations against the organization

In 2000, the Tamil novelist, Indumathi, accused the Oneness organization of pressuring her to recruit well-known personalities within her personal circle, such as Latha Rajinikanth.

In 2019, popular Taiwanese Actress Yi Nengjing removed her social media post promoting Kalki Bhagavan's teaching after the Chinese Communist Party through its Chinese Ministry of Public Security (MPS) and China Anti-Cult Association (CACA) issued a warning about the Oneness activities in the state run media Global Times. The Chinese Communist Party claimed that the Oneness Organization used '2012' philosophy to control its believers.

During the 1990s, local village people near the Oneness ashram organised protests against Kalki Bhagavan and his organization for cheaply buying up hundreds of acres of land from local farmers. Subsequently, some of the farmers had their land returned to them.

In the Indian media, there have been various allegations of misconduct against Kalki Bhagavan and activities being conducted inside his ashram. These include:

 accusations of Land-grabbing,
 charges of drug and sexual abuse, and
 allegations of forced monk-hood

Claims and predictions

Tenth avatar of Vishnu 

In 1990, Vijaykumar Naidu claimed to be Kalki, the tenth Avatar of Vishnu. Kalki Bhagavan's wife, otherwise known as 'Amma', claims to be Vishnu's consort, Padmavati. Kalki Bhagavan's claim that he had inaugurated the Hindu Golden Age was not well received by Hindu spiritual leaders.

According to Hindu Puranic tradition, Kalki rides a white horse and carries a fiery sword. He rejuvenates existence by ending the darkest and destructive period to remove adharma (lawlessness) and usher in a new era for believers. Prophesies written in the Vishnu Purana describe Kalki as marrying princess Padmavati of Simhala.

Vijaykumar and Padmavati make themselves available for public darshan, or a 'divine glimpse', and charge money to followers for the privilege. It costs around $60 for a 'divine glimpse' of the couple in a crowded room, and $700 for a one-on-one meeting with Kalki Bhagavan himself.

The Oxford Handbook of New Religious Movements says that Vijaykumar is currently the most famous of the spiritual leaders laying claim to being the final and future avatar of Kalki. Other individuals who have claimed to be Kalki include Agastya Joshi, who also  claimed to be Mahdi; and Samael Aun Weor, founder of the Universal Christian Gnostic Movement. Another claimant is Riaz Ahmed Gohar Shahi of the Kalki Avatar Foundation, founded in 2000 by Younus AlGohar. Yet another claimant was the American writer Adi Da (also known as 'Da Kalki').

The moola mantra (main chant of the cult) celebrates the godman as "the embodiment of truth-consciousness-bliss", referring to Vijaykumar as the "Supreme Godhead, Perfect Person and the Transcendent Self" (Satchidananda para brahman, Purushottam Paramatma).

Early criticisms of the Kalki cult 

Professor Makarand Paranjape, now Director of the Indian Institute of Advanced Study in Shimla, described his experience in 1997 when attending a 'darshan' ceremony at Vijaykumar's colony in Andhra Pradesh. After his visit, Makarand Paranjape described the movement as a new 'religion', or at least a new 'cult'; with Vijaykumar as a 'living god' served by his own monastic order; and with tales of miracles being performed. Paranjape quotes one of the followers who says that "No one can suppress our movement"; and that Kalki devotees are fanatical "...and will lay down their lives for Kalki, but never waver from their faith."

Paranjape is critical, saying that a follower's personal discovery of Kalki does not result in freedom from external authority. Rather, he says, it is in conforming to the official tenets of the cult, which is how it maintains tight control over its followers.

Another writer at the time, Shameem Akhtar, was also critical of what she called the 'Kalki craze' – which had started spreading to America and Russia. She describes stories of miracles attributed to Kalki Bhagavan, and the garlands of flowers on his portrait, which was revered by the dasas and followers. Shameem Akhtar described how there were seven acharyas, 'chosen ones', which included Anandagiri, responsible for propagating  in the USA the godman's prophesies of the "new light breaking upon the earth".

Mahavakyas (Commandments) of Kalki Bhagavan

Makarand Paranjape notes that when declaring himself to be the Kalki avatar, Vijaykumar issued a large collection of Mahavakyas, or 'commandments'. As an example, one of Kalki Bhagavan's Mahavakyas says: Formless as I am, I the Antaryamin shall awaken formless inside you, or it the form you desire, or the form I choose...for every form is my form. 

However, questioning this Mahavakya, Paranjape asks: "If Kalki is formless, or if all forms are his, why should one form, that embodied in the Srimurti (Vijaykumar's photograph), be preferred to all other forms?" Paranjape quotes other examples of the godman's Mahavakyas, which include: I am...the Supreme Creator, the Supremely Sacred, the Supreme immanent inner Controller of all that is, the immortal – I am Ishvara...With my coming, it is the dawn of the Golden Age of ten thousand years of a new cycle; for I incarnate to inaugurate every new cycle, every twenty-four thousand years. And also: Your nature has become sinful as you no longer relate to me...I transcend your understanding because you comprehend me only partially. Another of the Kalki Mahavakyas is: All these truths shall be revealed to you through my disciples.

Shameem Akhtar quotes Kalki Bhagavan in directing his followers to: Purify and cleanse yourselves of your sinful nature so that you could be saved by Me from the natural calamities and...varied sufferings that would issue forth from March 1998.

Claims as a godman 
As a godman, Vijaykumar has made a number of claims and predictions. In a 2005 video interview with Mitchel Jay Rabin for A Better World TV,  he claimed to have supernatural powers like the ability to: 
 Revive dead people back to life 
 Materialize honey from his photograph (also called Srimurti)
 Bring rains to drought prone villages 
 Transfer these supernatural powers to his devotees and monks

In a 2002 interview to the India Today magazine, he called himself 'spiritual supermarket', and claimed to have the ability to make people experience God:"You can be a Christian and I will make you see Christ. You can be a Hindu and I can make you see Rama. I am a spiritual supermarket"  – Vijaykumar, 2002 

In the same interview, he claimed to have clairvoyant powers – "If you ask me whether you will own an Opel Astra, I will shut my eyes and try to see you in one. If I see the image, I'll tell you that you will own it within a given period" – Vijaykumar, 2002

He also claimed to be an incarnation of God – "I believe I can function like God and rid people of their miseries." – Vijaykumar, 2002

Rebuttal of godman claims 
Vijaykumar's claims of having miraculous, supernatural, paranormal and spiritual powers have been contested and rebutted repeatedly by rationalists and scientists over the years.

In 2002, Bhagavan claimed that miracle of honey flowing from his picture was witnessed by well known Indian Rationalist Hosur Narasimhaiah, who in turn claims not to have witnessed the said miracle.

The Dakshina Kannada Rationalist Association, a well known rationalist group based in Mangalore, Karnataka has debunked his various claims of miracles over the years.

Death of organised religions 
In 2002, Kalki Bhagavan predicted that all organised religions would die between 2005 and 2012 and that only his Kalki cult would survive. In 2019, after large-scale raids by Income Tax officials, writer DP Satish observed that the godman has been proved wrong and that "the opposite is now happening". As of 2010, Christianity had an estimated 2.2 billion followers worldwide, while Islam had 1.6 billion. Hinduism had around 1 billion. These numbers are predicted to grow substantially in the coming decades.

Scientific claims for deeksha 
Kalki Bhagavan claims that when enough people have received 'deeksha', a type of Oneness 'blessing', a critical mass will be reached, affecting the collective DNA of humanity. He also claims that enlightenment is a neurobiological process, and that overactive parietal lobes are the "biological seat of the ego". Another of his claims is that many psychochosomatic ailments are healed by deeksha. However, after initially supporting these claims in 2006, author Arjuna Ardagh later wrote that pilot studies in India and the USA had found little indication that deeksha has any effect on the brain that was different from meditation or other kinds of relaxation.

2012 Phenomenon 

Kalki Bhagavan had claimed that by 2012, he would enlighten 64,000 people to a state of extremely high consciousness who will in turn 'enlighten' the rest of humanity. In 2002, he announced that in the coming decade, humanity would be entering a new Golden Age, and he was going facilitate the transition.

In 2004, Mayanist Carl Johan Calleman based on interpretations of the Mayan calendar, collaborated with Sri Bhagavan to initiate a worldwide festival called Oneness Celebration on the occasion of the Venus Transit of June 3, 2004. During that period, Kalki Bhagavan claimed that by the year 2012, inside the Oneness Temple, there would be between 5,000 and 8,000 people meditating at all times.

Most western spiritual seekers lost interest in the Oneness Movement when they did not experience any 'spiritual awakening' and 'enlightenment' promised to them by Kalki Bhagavan. There was further disappointment when, after 21 December 2012, the much anticipated and supposed 'Golden Age' of 'world enlightenment' prophesied by Kalki Bhagavan did not occur.

Cause of human suffering 
Kalki Bhagavan claims that the only cause for human suffering is the strong sense of a separate self that each individual experiences that gives each the feeling of "me and a not-me". According to him, this is what causes problems in the home, in relationships between people, and in wars between nations.

Business activities and real estate development

White Lotus conglomerate

Kalki Bhagavan runs the White Lotus Conglomerate along with his son N.K.V. Krishna, and daughter-in-law Preetha Krishna. The White Lotus is a conglomerate of family businesses in various sectors like real estate, property development, energy, media and sport having names like White Lotus Group, Kosmik/Kosmic, Sacredbanyan, Transend, KPL, Bluewater, Golden Lotus, Goldenage, Chatrachaya, Yogi and Enlite. Senior members of the former Oneness organization also sit on the boards of these companies. These include two acharyas originally in charge of the order of the monks, Ananda Giri and Jyothirmayee Chundi, also known as Samadarshini. Ananda Giri was NKV Krishna's best friend at school. In the early days of the Oneness organization, Samadarshini was head of the Kalki order of nuns in Bangalore.

In 2020, the White Lotus group joined a consortium which is bidding upwards of $200 Million USD to buy Reliance Communications from Indian Business tycoon Anil Ambani.

The Dubai-based White Lotus Investment Group was co-founded by tycoon Raju Poosapati (PSR Raju), an associate of N.K.V Krishna. The group has invested in The Pinnacle tower in Nairobi, the tallest in Africa, which is currently under construction. The Pinnacle is a joint venture between White Lotus, Jabavu Village and the Hass Petroleum Group. Between them, the White Lotus and Hass organisations are investing about $200 million in the Pinnacle project. However, as of September 2019, construction of the Pinnacle had stalled. During 2019, the White Lotus Projects group was found to be in contempt of court for proceeding with the Pinnacle project in violation of two court orders issued in 2017. In February 2020, Nairobi police issued an arrest warrant for the CEO of White Lotus, Raju Poosapati. The White Lotus property development group also has offices in Chicago and Omaha, Nebraska.

Real estate development
Kalki Bhagavan and his family have invested in developing The Pinnacle in Nairobi, the tallest tower in Africa. The Pinnacle is a co-development with the Hass Petroleum group. Between them, White Lotus Group and Hass Petroleum have invested $200 million in the Pinnacle Project. The White Lotus Group owns the 1930s Redick Tower building in Lincoln, Nebraska. After a $7 million re-development, it was re-opened in 2010 as the Hotel Deco XV.

The Indian media have reported accusations of Land-grabbing.

Music, media and sport
One of the Kalki family businesses, production company Kosmik Global Media, owns the Bengaluru Bulls, a Pro Kabaddi League team. Kosmik Music, is a music label with more than 1,200 titles ranging from  Classical, Spiritual, Fusion, New Age, Devotional and Film.  Its most successful brand is "Sacred Chants" that was from traditional Vedic hymns.

Bhagavan through his associates, is reported to own a defunct  media company Studio N, a satellite television channel that is presently shuttered. It is reported to have  been purchased in 2014 from Narne Srinivas Rao, father-in-law of film actor N. T. Rama Rao Jr.

Legal cases

Court action by social activist 

In 2002, Social activist Viswanath Swami filed a complaint with the Indian Income-Tax Department, alleging that Vijayakumar and his associate R. Shankar had floated more than 10 trusts for rural development and obtained tax exemption for funds collected by these trusts. Swami alleged that Kalki Bhagavan was using these funds to help setup multiple businesses for his son NKV Krishna, rather than using the money for the stated purpose. Following this, in 2004, the Madras High Court took up a public interest litigation alleging misuse of public funds by various Kalki trusts. The Madras High Court then rejected this plea for a probe. Later, when the petitioner approached the Supreme Court of India, a Supreme Court  bench comprising Justice Ruma Pal and Justice P. Venkatarama Reddi, upheld the judgement of the Madras High Court. The Supreme court of India after hearing counsel Prashant Bhushan, dismissed and rejected the petition by Vishwanath Swami,

Lawsuit against newspaper 
In 2019, writing for the Times of India, Arun Ram recounts that, in 2002, he wrote an article about Kalki Bhagavan's Oneness Movement which resulted in a multi-million dollar lawsuit against the publication. However, the Mumbai High Court found in favour of the publication, and the media's 'right to write'.

Income tax raids

In October 2019, more than 300 Income Tax department officials and police personnel raided about 40 premises associated with various businesses owned by Kalki Bhagavan and his family. During the marathon raid which took place for 5 days, the department confiscated unaccounted assets including:
 Cash and gold worth US$12 Million
 Cash receipts worth US$55 Million

Investigators say Kalki Bhagavan laundered money and purchased assets abroad through Hawala transactions. His son N.K.V. Krishna and Krishna's wife, Preetha Krishna, were questioned by the income tax department.

The Enforcement Directorate registered a case against Bhagavan and Krishna under the Foreign Exchange Management Act. In December 2019, 907 acres of land owned by Kalki Bhagavan and his family was attached by Indian Law Enforcement  agencies.

Reporters subsequently visiting Kalki Bhagavan's ashram near Chennai found it to be deserted, with the eleven cash counters all closed.

Kalki Bhagavan issued a statement denying that he had fled the country. The investigation is in progress. The Madras High Court granted time for the Income Tax Department to file its counter affidavit to a writ petition preferred by Preetha Krishna against a look out circular issued by the department preventing her from flying abroad without receiving an Income Tax Department clearance certificate.

Preetha Krishna's request to travel to the US and Ukraine was denied by the Income Tax Department assistant director K Mahadevan, who said that her presence would be necessary for the investigation.

Personal information

Alternative names 
Kalki Bhagavan (born Vijaykumar Naidu) is referred to by his followers as Sri Bhagavan, and popularly known as Kalki Bhagavan. He has also been called simply Kalki, and several other names including Bhagavan Ishwara and Mukteshwar. In Sanskrit, Mukteshwar means 'Lord of Salvation'.

Kalki Bhagavan's wife has been known by several names including Bujjamma, 'Padmavathi' and 'Amma'. Kalki Bhagavan and his wife together are known by their followers as Amma Bhagavan.

Early life 

Vijay Kumar Naidu was born on 7 March 1949 in Natham Village, Gudiyatham Town, Vellore district, Tamil Nadu, to Smt. Vaidarbhi Amma and Sri Varadarajulu. His father was the head of the accounts department of Indian Railways and his mother was a simple village woman. In 1955, when Vijay Kumar Naidu was six years of age, the family moved to Chennai. There, he attended Don Bosco School in Chennai. Later, he graduated from DG Vaishnav College in Chennai, majoring in mathematics. After completing college, he began working as an office clerk for Life Insurance Corporation of India (LIC).

Vijay Kumar Naidu married Smt. Padmavathi on 9 June 1977. This was an arranged marriage following the prevalent customary practice in India for marriages decided by elders in the family. Padmavathi, who is addressed as Amma by their students, takes an interest and participation in building the spiritual organization Oneness.

At an early age, Vijay Kumar Naidu was introduced to the philosophy of Jiddu Krishnamurti by his childhood friend R. Sankar. This drew him to the Theosophical Society in Chennai, to which he was a frequent visitor.

In 1983, Vijaykumar was expelled from the Rishi Valley School where he used to work as an administrator with R. Sankar.

Health 
Kalki Bhagavan has been suffering from ill health for a long time.

During 2012–2013, Kalki Bhagavan was severely ill and underwent an open heart surgery in Apollo Hospital in Chennai. 

In October 2016, Kalki Bhagavan was again admitted to the Apollo Hospital in Chennai due to a health ailment. He was rushed to the hospital from his ashram at Nemam on the outskirts of the city after he complained of uneasiness.

In November 2019, he was admitted to an Intensive care unit (ICU) of a private hospital at Vanagaram, after he suffered a heart attack.

Political affiliation 
Kalki Bhagavan has close affiliation with the Telugu Desam Party (TDP), a regional political party in the Indian states of Andhra Pradesh and Telangana. Vijaykumar Naidu along with the top leaders of the TDP, including former chief minister N. Chandrababu Naidu, belong to the politically dominant Kamma community. When the TDP was in power, lawmakers used to frequent Vijaykumar's ashram.

Vijaykumar openly supported the TDP in the Lok Sabha and assembly elections in Andhra Pradesh in 2019. Leaders of the regional party YSR Congress, and other opposition parties alleged that the TDP ran its election campaign with the help of Bhagavan's employees who doubled as party workers. K. Adhimulam, a YSR Congress leader, alleged that Kalki Bhagavan was actively funding TDP's election campaign and that his ashram staff were distributing money to voters.

Vijaykumar's son NKV Krishna has deeper links with the Telugu Desam Party; he is the co-owner of the news channel Studio N, which was founded and run by TDP party members.

Family 
Vijaykumar's immediate family includes his wife Padmavati, his son NKV Krishna, and daughter-in-law Preetha Krishna.

See also 
 Ekam - The Oneness Temple
 Diksha
 Antaryamin

External links
 Official Website
 The School for Enlightenment
 World Oneness TV
 Website and Profile of Sankar Bhagavadpada (R. Sankar), co-founder of the Oneness Movement; and Vijaykumar's childhood friend.

References

1949 births
Living people
People from Tamil Nadu
Founders of Indian schools and colleges
20th-century Indian philosophers
Hindu revivalists
Indian Hindu spiritual teachers
Indian businesspeople
Indian real estate businesspeople
New Age spiritual leaders
People considered avatars by their followers
2012 phenomenon
Self-declared messiahs
Supernatural healing
Cult leaders
Founders of new religious movements
Prophets